Ferdinand Grössing (born 6 November 1952) is an Austrian bobsledder. He competed in the four man event at the 1984 Winter Olympics.

References

1952 births
Living people
Austrian male bobsledders
Olympic bobsledders of Austria
Bobsledders at the 1984 Winter Olympics
Place of birth missing (living people)